The Superwife (German: Das Superweib) is a 1996 German comedy film directed by Sönke Wortmann and starring Veronica Ferres, Joachim Król and Richy Müller. Veteran star Liselotte Pulver appears in a supporting role.

Cast

Reception
The film was the third most popular German film of the year with admissions of 2.3 million, behind only Werner: Eat My Dust!!! and Jailbirds.

References

Bibliography 
 Mattias Frey. Postwall German Cinema: History, Film History and Cinephilia. Berghahn Books, 2013.

External links 
 

1996 films
1996 comedy films
German comedy films
1990s German-language films
Films directed by Sönke Wortmann
Films based on German novels
Films about writers
Films about divorce
Films about filmmaking
Films produced by Bernd Eichinger
Constantin Film films
1990s German films